Rugantino is a musical comedy by Pietro Garinei and Sandro Giovannini, which debuted at the Teatro Sistina in Rome, Italy, on 15 December 1962. Music was written by Armando Trovaioli.

It is a comedy set in the papal Rome of the 19th century. Actors who played in the first edition included Nino Manfredi (Rugantino), Aldo Fabrizi (as Mastro Titta, a historical executioner), Lea Massari (Rosetta, later replaced by Ornella Vanoni) and Bice Valori (Eusebia). In the second Italian edition Rugantino was played by Enrico Montesano, and Rosetta by Alida Chelli.

The comedy was also performed in Toronto and New York City (opening at the Mark Hellinger Theatre in February 1964), in an English version translated by Alfred Drake with lyric translation by Edward Eager.

References

Musicals based on secular traditions
1962 musicals
Italian musicals
Broadway musicals